Hajji Mirza Khan may refer to:
 Hajji Mirza Khan, Kermanshah
 Hajji Mirza Khan, Sistan and Baluchestan